The Battle of the Morcuera, was a battle of the Spanish Reconquista that took place in the Hoz de la Morcuera between the municipalities of Foncea and Bugedo nearby the city of Miranda de Ebro on 9 August, 865. The battle was fought between the combined Christian troops of the Kingdom of Castile and the Kingdom of Asturias under Rodrigo of Castile and the Muslim forces of the Emirate of Cordoba under Muhammad I of Córdoba. The battle resulted in a victory for the Cordobans and a general retreat in the overall Reconquista process.

Battle 
In the year 865, Muhammad I of Córdoba attacked the Kingdom of Asturias during the reign of Ordoño I. Christian forces under the command of Rodrigo of Castile, the count of Castile, were attacked in the gorge of Hoz de la Morcuera. The Muslim forces surprised the Christian forces throughout the Miranda de Ebro valley and the fighting carried all the way to Añana. After retreating from the general area, Rodrigo of Castile attempted to cut off the Muslim escape route at Pancorbo, but failed when the Muslims gained knowledge of his intentions. They escaped by way of the basin of the Oja River.

This defeat caused a general halt to the re-population efforts undertaken by the Christians in the area of Meseta Central, a job that Ordoño I's son, Alfonso III of Asturias would continue throughout his own reign. Alfonso III would also there deal with sectors of the Asturian nobility who had desires for independence.

Muhammad I of Córdoba took advantage of the disabilities encountered by the Christians when they further lost the fortresses of Cerezo Río Tirón, Ibrillos and Grañón to send new waves of attack in 866 and 867.

The Muslim historian Ibn Idhari recounts the battle in his book Al-Bayan al-Mughrib:

See also 
 Reconquista
 Muhammad I of Córdoba
 Emirate of Córdoba
 Kingdom of Asturias

References 
 The information on this page was translated from its Spanish equivalent.

External links 
Textos para la historia de Al-Andalus

865
the Morcuera
Morcuera
Morcuera
Morcuera
the Morcuera
9th century in Al-Andalus